is a small town in the district of Barnim, in Brandenburg, Germany. The municipality is the administrative seat of the Amt ("collective municipality") Amt Joachimsthal.

History

Joachimsthal was founded in 1601 by Elector Joachim III Frederick of Brandenburg at the foot of medieval Grimnitz Castle and received town privileges in 1604. The Elector had a glass foundry erected and in 1607 established a boarding school, the Joachimsthalsches Gymnasium, that was relocated to Berlin after its devastation in 1636 during the Thirty Years' War. After a blaze in 1814, the church and several houses were rebuilt according to plans by Karl Friedrich Schinkel.

King Frederick William IV of Prussia had the Hubertusstock hunting lodge erected on the western shore of the Werbellinsee in 1849. In changing times, Hubertusstock served as a pleasure ground for men in power: The German Emperors from the House of Hohenzollern indulged in huntsmanship (Wilhelm II had his own train station built), as did the Presidents of the Weimar Republic, Friedrich Ebert and Paul von Hindenburg. In 1944 Adolf Hitler gave the lodge to Obergruppenführer Hans Lammers and in 1973 it was rebuilt as a vacation home for General Secretary Erich Honecker.

Twin town
 Golczewo, Poland

Demography

See also
Grimnitzsee
Werbellinsee

Notable people

Sons and daughters 

Franz Ernst Neumann (1798–1895), physicist

Honorary citizen 

The first honorary citizen (1951) was S. K. Thoden van Velzen (1870-1957), who worked as a doctor in the town. In the last days of the Second World War, he prevented the destruction of the town, with a white flag of the approaching Red Army.

Persons associated with Joachimsthal 
 Friedrich Brunold (1811-1894), Brandenburg writer, died in Joachimsthal

References

External links

Localities in Barnim
1601 establishments in the Holy Roman Empire
Populated places established in 1601